Robin Maxwell Strong (born 9 February 1944) is a New Zealand former professional rugby league footballer who played in the 1950s and 1960s. He has lived in the USA since 1969.

Playing career

Representative career
Strong represented the New Zealand on the 1965 New Zealand rugby league tour of Great Britain and France.

References

External links
Search for "Robin" at rugbyleagueproject.org
Search for "Strong" at rugbyleagueproject.org

New Zealand national rugby league team players
New Zealand rugby league players
Place of birth missing (living people)
Living people
Rugby league centres
Wellington rugby league team players
1944 births